This is a list of Polish chess masters. Some players later in their careers assumed the citizenship of another country (for example Janowski and Najdorf later became French and Argentinian citizens respectively).

Pre-FIDE chess masters 
 Adolf Zytogorski
 Jan Herman Zukertort
 Szymon Winawer
 Dawid Janowski
 Henryk Jerzy Salwe
 Dawid Przepiórka
 Teodor Regedziński

FIDE chess masters

Men 
 1950 – Akiba Rubinstein – Grandmaster
 1950 – Ksawery Tartakower – Grandmaster
 1950 – Mieczysław Najdorf – Grandmaster
 1950 – Kazimierz Makarczyk
 1950 – Kazimierz Plater
 1953 – Bogdan Śliwa
 1955 – Paulin Frydman
 1976 – Włodzimierz Schmidt – Grandmaster
 1980 – Adam Kuligowski – Grandmaster
 1990 – Aleksander Wojtkiewicz – Grandmaster
 1993 – Robert Kuczyński – Grandmaster
 1996 – Marcin Kamiński – Grandmaster
 1996 – Robert Kempiński – Grandmaster
 1996 – Michał Krasenkow – Grandmaster
 1997 – Jacek Gdański – Grandmaster
 1998 – Bartłomiej Macieja – Grandmaster
 1998 – Tomasz Markowski – Grandmaster
 1999 – Bartosz Soćko – Grandmaster
 2000 – Paweł Jaracz – Grandmaster
 2001 – Paweł Blehm – Grandmaster
 2002 – Artur Jakubiec – Grandmaster
 2002 – Kamil Mitoń – Grandmaster
 2002 – Mirosław Grabarczyk – Grandmaster
 2003 – Łukasz Cyborowski – Grandmaster
 2003 – Aleksander Miśta – Grandmaster
 2005 – Mateusz Bartel – Grandmaster
 2005 – Piotr Bobras – Grandmaster
 2005 – Radosław Wojtaszek – Grandmaster
 2006 – Paweł Czarnota – Grandmaster
 2006 – Grzegorz Gajewski – Grandmaster
 2006 – Bartłomiej Heberla – Grandmaster
 2006 – Radosław Jedynak – Grandmaster
 2007 – Marcin Dziuba – Grandmaster
 2008 – Monika Soćko – Grandmaster (2008), Woman Grandmaster (1995)
 2009 – Krzysztof Jakubowski – Grandmaster
 2009 – Wojciech Moranda – Grandmaster
 2009 – Michał Olszewski – Grandmaster
 2009 – Dariusz Świercz – Grandmaster
 2010 – Rafał Antoniewski – Grandmaster
 2012 – Krzysztof Bulski – Grandmaster
 2010 – Kacper Piorun – Grandmaster
 2012 – Jacek Tomczak – Grandmaster
 2013 – Jan-Krzysztof Duda – Grandmaster
 2013 – Kamil Dragun – Grandmaster
 2013 – Marcin Tazbir – Grandmaster
 2014 – Zbigniew Pakleza – Grandmaster
 2015 – Jacek Stopa – Grandmaster
 2016 – Marcel Kanarek – Grandmaster
 2017 – Daniel Sadzikowski – Grandmaster
 2017 – Tomasz Warakomski – Grandmaster
 2018 – Grzegorz Nasuta – Grandmaster
 2019 – Oskar Wieczorek – Grandmaster
 2020 – Maciej Klekowski – Grandmaster
 2021 – Łukasz Jarmuła – Grandmaster

Women 
 1981 – Hanna Ereńska – Woman Grandmaster
 1984 – Krystyna Hołuj-Radzikowska – Woman Grandmaster
 1986 – Agnieszka Brustman – Woman Grandmaster
 1994 – Krystyna Dąbrowska – Woman Grandmaster
 1995 – Monika Soćko (Bobrowska) – Woman Grandmaster (1995), Grandmaster (2008)
 1997 – Joanna Dworakowska – Woman Grandmaster, International Master (2001)
 1998 – Iweta Rajlich – Woman Grandmaster, International Master (2002)
 1999 – Marta Michna – Woman Grandmaster
 2005 – Jolanta Zawadzka – Woman Grandmaster
 2006 – Beata Zawadzka – Woman Grandmaster
 2007 – Barbara Jaracz – Woman Grandmaster
 2008 – Monika Krupa – Woman Grandmaster
 2009 – Marta Bartel – Woman Grandmaster
 2009 – Joanna Majdan – Woman Grandmaster
 2010 – Karina Cyfka – Woman Grandmaster, International Master (2016)
 2012 – Katarzyna Toma – Woman Grandmaster
 2013 – Joanna Worek – Woman Grandmaster
 2014 – Klaudia Kulon – Woman Grandmaster, International Master (2019)

References

Polish chess masters
Chess masters